Charles Townsend Copeland (April 27, 1860 – July 24, 1952) was a professor, poet, and writer.

He graduated from Harvard University and spent much of his time as a mentor at Harvard, where he served in several posts, including Boylston Professor of Rhetoric from 1925 to 1928. He also worked as a part-time theater critic.  Known as "Copey" by many of his peers and admirers, he became known for his Harvard poetry readings in the 1920s and 30s.  In her autobiography, The Story of My Life, Helen Keller paid high praise to Copeland as an instructor. He also taught at the Harvard Extension School.

References

Further reading
 J. Donald Adams, Copey of Harvard: A Biography of Charles Townsend Copeland (Boston: Houghton Mifflin, 1960).
 Billy Altman, Laughter's Gentle Soul: The Life of Robert Benchley. (New York City: W. W. Norton, 1997. ).
 Encyclopædia Britannica: Charles Townsend Copeland.

External links
 

1860 births
1952 deaths
Harvard University faculty
Harvard University alumni
Harvard Extension School faculty